Marxist Forum was a discussion group established by members of the Communist Party of Britain who were either expelled or resigned in the wake of the 1998 Morning Star dispute. Prominent members of the group included former CPB general secretary Mike Hicks, Marxist economist Ron Bellamy, former Morning Star chief executive Mary Rosser and former CPB North West District Secretary Peter Ritman. It published a number of editions of a journal, but the current status of this, and the group in general, is unknown.

References

Defunct political organisations based in the United Kingdom